Sariful Razz (born 18 November 1991) is a Bangladeshi actor and model known for starring Poran, Hawa,Gunin, No Dorai, Damal and Networker Baire.

Early life
Sariful Razz was born in Brahmanbaria, Bangladesh and but spent his childhood mostly in Sylhet due to his father's professional placement. He studied at The Aided High School and Madan Mohan College in Sylhet. After passing Higher Secondary in 2009 he came to Dhaka for higher studies and eventually involved in modelling.

Career
Before making his debut in Dhallywood Razz worked as a ramp model. Besides, he also worked in commercials.

Raaz made his debut in Dhallywood in 2016. The name of his first film was Ice Cream where he acted opposite Nazifa Tushi. Minar Rahman made his playback career debut with this film.

In 2019 the second film of Raaz was released. The name of his second film was No Dorai where he acted opposite Sunerah Binte Kamal.

The next three films of Raaz released in 2022. The name of these films are Poran, Hawa. and Damal.

Personal life
On 17 October 2021, Razz married Pori Moni, a Dhallywood actress and co-star of him from the film Gunin. The information about the marriage was kept secret from media and public until the actress became pregnant. As per news from January 2022, they were expecting a baby together. Razz-Porimoni became parents of a boy, Shaheem Muhammad Rajya, on 10 August 2022. 

On 31 December, he and Pori Moni got separated as Pori Moni confirmed her separation with Razz via social media later stating that she left his house with son Rajya a day prior.

Filmography

Films

Web Content

References

External links
 

Living people
1991 births
Bangladeshi male models
Bangladeshi male film actors
People from Kasba Upazila